The Jacksonville Open is a defunct men's tennis tournament founded in 1961 as the Jacksonville Invitation originally played on outdoor hard courts later switching to indoor courts. The tournament ran until 1977.

History
The Jacksonville Open tennis tournament was founded in 1961 as the Jacksonville Invitation. The tournament was part South Florida-Caribbean Circuit which was a major feature of the international tennis scene in from the 1930s to early 1970s. In 1972 it part of the 1972 USLTA Indoor Circuit. The event was held in Jacksonville, Florida and was played on indoor hard courts.  Jimmy Connors won the singles title, defeating Clark Graebner in the final.
Also in 1972 a Jacksonsville Invitation tournament for women was established as an outdoor clay court event. It sponsorship name was the Virginia Slims of Jacksonville.

Singles

References

External links
 Singles draw

Hard court tennis tournaments
Defunct tennis tournaments in the United States
Defunct tennis tournaments in Florida
Jacksonville Open (tennis)
1972 in sports in Florida
1972 in tennis